A commercial bank is a financial institution which accepts deposits from the public and gives loans for the purposes of consumption and investment to make profit.

It can also refer to a bank, or a division of a large bank, which deals with corporations or a large/middle-sized business to differentiate it from a retail bank and an investment bank.
Commercial banks include private sector banks and public sector banks.

History

The name bank derives from the Italian word banco "desk/bench", used during the Italian Renaissance era by Florentine bankers, who used to carry out their transactions on a desk covered by a green tablecloth. However, traces of banking activity can be found even in ancient times.

In the United States, the term commercial bank was often used to distinguish it from an investment bank due to differences in bank regulation. After the Great Depression, through the Glass–Steagall Act, the U.S. Congress required that commercial banks only engage in banking activities, whereas investment banks were limited to capital market activities. This separation was mostly repealed in 1999 by the Gramm–Leach–Bliley Act.

Role
The general role of commercial banks is to provide financial services to the general public and business, ensuring economic and social stability and sustainable growth of the economy.

In this respect, credit creation is the most significant function of commercial banks. While sanctioning a loan to a customer, they do not provide cash to the borrower. Instead, they open a deposit account from which the borrower can withdraw. In other words, while sanctioning a loan, they automatically create deposits.

Primary functions 
Commercial banks accept various types of deposits from the public especially from its clients, including saving account deposits, recurring account deposits, and fixed deposits. These deposits are returned whenever the customer demands it or after a certain time period.
Commercial banks provide loans and advances of various forms, Such as [overdraft] facility, cash credit, bill discounting, money at call, etc. They also give demand and term loans to all types of clients against proper security. They also act as trustees for wills of their customers etc.
The function of credit creation is generated on the basis of credit and payment intermediary. Commercial banks use the deposits they absorb to make loans. On the basis of check circulation and transfer settlement, the loans are converted into derivative deposits. To a certain extent, the derivative funds of several times the original deposits are increased, which greatly improves the driving force of commercial banks to serve the economic development.

Regulations

In most countries, commercial banks are heavily regulated and this is typically done by a country's central bank.  They will impose a number of conditions on the banks that they regulate such as keeping bank reserves and to maintain minimum capital requirements.

Services by product
Commercial banks generally provide a number of services to its clients; these can be split into core banking services such as deposits, loans, and other services which are related to payment systems and other financial services.

Core products and services
 Accepting money on various types of Deposit accounts
 Lending money by overdraft, and loans both secured and unsecured.
 Providing transaction accounts 
 Cash management
 Treasury management
 Private equity financing
 Issuing Bank drafts and Bank cheques
 Processing payments via telegraphic transfer, EFTPOS, internet banking, or other payment methods.

Other functions
Along with core products and services, commercial banks perform several secondary functions. The secondary functions of commercial banks can be divided into agency functions and utility functions.

Agency functions include:
 To collect and clear cheques, dividends, and interest warrant
 To make payments of rent, insurance premium
 To deal in foreign exchange transactions
 To purchase and sell securities
 To act as the trustee, attorney, correspondent and executor
 To accept tax proceeds and tax returns

Utility functions include:
 To provide safe deposit boxes to customers
 To provide money transfer facility
 To issue traveler's cheques
 To act as referees
 To accept various bills for payment: phone bills, gas bills, water bills
 To provide various cards such as credit cards and debit cards

See also
 Assets and Liabilities of Commercial Banks in the United States
 Glass–Steagall legislation
 Investment banking
 Mortgage constant
 Retail bank
 Universal bank

References

Further reading
  Abstract
 
 Commercial Banks directory and guidelines Commercial Banks

Banks
Banking terms